Fanny Dombre-Coste (née Dombre; born 1 October 1956) is a French Socialist politician who was Member of Parliament for Hérault's 3rd constituency from 2012 to 2017.

Political career 
She lost her seat to Coralie Dubost of La République En Marche! in the 2017 French legislative election.

Family 
Her mothers cousin was Louise Weiss the famous feminist.

See also 

 List of deputies of the 14th National Assembly of France

References 

1956 births
Living people
Socialist Party (France) politicians
People from Seine-Maritime
Deputies of the 14th National Assembly of the French Fifth Republic
21st-century French women politicians
Women mayors of places in France
Members of Parliament for Hérault